Linda Richards  is an Australian researcher at Queensland Brain Institute (QBI) at the University of Queensland.

Early life and education 
Richards undertook undergraduate studies at Monash University, and at the University of Melbourne, where she was awarded a Bachelor of Science in 1990. Her PhD, researching the determination of neuronal lineage of in the developing spinal cord, was conferred in 1995 from the laboratory of Perry Bartlett, at the Walter and Eliza Hall Institute of Medical Research in Melbourne.

Work 
Richards began her postdoctoral training at the Salk Institute of Biological Studies, in the laboratory of Professor Dennis O'Leary. In 1997 she established her own laboratory at the University of Maryland medical school. In 2005 she returned to Australia, taking up a position at the University of Queensland, where she was appointed Associate Professor in the QBI, and the School of Biomedical Sciences. She was subsequently promoted to Professor in 2010.

Richardson is the head of the Cortical Development and Axon Guidance Laboratory at the QBI. The laboratory researches the cellular and molecular mechanisms which regulate the formation and development of the corpus callosum. The research focus of her laboratory to study the development of the cortical midline in animal models and in human tissue.  In particular, she is involved in researching a phenomenon where the corpus callosum is absent (agenesis) or disformed (dysgenesis) in the developing brain. This condition affects 1 in 4000 people, and is associated with 50 different human congenital disorders.

Richards also acts as scientific advisor for the Australian Disorders of the Corpus Callosum.

Awards and honours 
 2010 Nina Kondelos Prize for "outstanding contribution to basic or clinical neuroscience research" awarded by the Australian Neuroscience Society.
 2013 Equity and Diversity Award awarded by the University of Queensland.
2015 elected Fellow of the Australian Academy of Science.
 2016 elected Fellow of the Australian Academy of Health and Medical Sciences.
 2019 Queen's Birthday Honours — Officer of the Order of Australia (AO) for "distinguished service to medical research and education in the field of developmental neurobiology, and to community engagement in science".

Brain Bee Challenge 
In 2006, Richards founded the Australian-New Zealand Brain Bee Challenge. This a competition for secondary students interested in neuroscience. The goal is to educate students and teachers about neuroscience and to encourage students from rural Australia and New Zealand to become involved in neuroscience.

References

Other sources 
 
  

Australian neuroscientists
Australian women neuroscientists
Living people
Fellows of the Australian Academy of Science
Australian Women of Neuroscience 2014
Monash University alumni
University of Melbourne alumni
Academic staff of the University of Queensland
Year of birth missing (living people)
Officers of the Order of Australia
Fellows of the Australian Academy of Health and Medical Sciences